Bagha Jatin is a Bengali biographical film directed by Hiranmoy Sen based on the life of Indian revolutionary Bagha Jatin. This film was released in 1958 under the banner of Bharati Chitram Private Limited. This is the debut film of Bengali actor Nimu Bhowmik.

Plot
The film portrays the life of Bengali freedom fighter Jatindranath Mukherjee alias Bagha Jatin and his struggle against the British Imperialism in India. Dhiraj Bhattacharya played the role of the revolutionary in this movie which brought him praise of critics.

Cast
 Dhiraj Bhattacharya
 Nimu Bhowmik
 Chhaya Devi
 Shyam Laha
 Sisir Batabyal
 Bechu Singh

References

1958 films
1958 war films
1950s Bengali-language films
Indian war films
Indian biographical films
Indian political films
Films set in the Indian independence movement